Mute is a Colombian cuisine soup from Boyacá and Santander departments. The word may be used as slang for a whole corn soup in other areas. In Santander cuisine, ingredients include pork parts, corn, and vegetables. In Boyaca, beef and potato seem to be used more commonly. Goat meat can also used.

References

Colombian soups
Santander Department
Goat dishes